This article provides details of international football games played by the Ukraine national football team from 2020 to present.

Results

2020

2021

2022

Notes

References

Ukraine national football team results
2020s in Ukrainian sport